The Reverend Thomas Firminger Thiselton-Dyer, MA, Oxon (25 July 1848 – 14 July 1923) was a son of William George Thiselton-Dyer, physician and of Catherine Jane, née Firminger. He was educated at King's College School and at Pembroke College, Oxford. He was successively curate of St John's Church, Fitzroy Square, curate of Holy Trinity Church, Kilburn, vicar of St Paul's Church, Penzance, secretary of the South American Missionary Society and rector of Bayfield, Holt, Norfolk. 

Thiselton-Dyer wrote several popular non-fiction books, including British Customs: Past and Present, The Folk-lore of Plants, and Strange Pages from Family Papers, which was considered a masterpiece of popular historical writing.

See also
 William Turner Thiselton-Dyer, brother

References

External links

 
 
 
  (under 'T' as by Thiselton-Dyer)

Individual books
 English folk-lore (1878)
 Folk-Lore of Shakespeare (1883)
 Church-lore Gleanings (1892)
 Royalty in all ages; the amusements, eccentricities, accomplishments, superstitions, and frolics of the kings and queens of Europe (1903)
 Folk-lore of women as illustrated by legendary and traditional tales, folk-rhymes, proverbial sayings, superstitions, etc. (1911) from Sacred Texts.
 
 

1848 births
1923 deaths
English male non-fiction writers
People educated at King's College School, London
Alumni of Pembroke College, Oxford
Clergy of the Diocese of Truro
English non-fiction writers